Perfect Symmetry may refer to:

Perfect Symmetry (Fates Warning album), 1989
Perfect Symmetry (Keane album), 2008
"Perfect Symmetry" (song)
Perfect Symmetry (tour), by Keane

See also
Symmetry, a harmonious proportionality, or "patterned self-similarity"